Companiganj is an upazila of Sylhet District in the Division of Sylhet, Bangladesh.

History
In 1779, the Khasi people attacked merchants in the village of Pandua in Bholaganj, who were going towards Calcutta after they experienced abuse from Europeans. Many merchants pleaded Robert Lindsay, the Collector of Sylhet, to build a small brick fort to protect them from further attacks from the Khasi.

In 1789, the Collector of Sylhet, John Willes, stationed many sepoys in Pandua. The Khasi however, continued their attacks, killing the thanadar and many sepoys. Two European merchants managed to escape and inform Willes of the incident, who passed it on to the Government at Calcutta. A force was then sent from there to the village of Pandua, although it led to a bloodless end. Willes also told the government that he really had little control over northern Sylhet as the Khasi chiefs refused every order, would behead the messenger and then continue raiding Sylheti villages as they had done even during the Mughal Empire period. Another Khasi raid took place in 1795 and many years went after that with the Khasis remaining in their hills and not troubling the plains.

In 1976, the Companiganj Thana was established based in the village of Burdeo in the banks of the Dhalai River. It consisted of the current Companiganj Upazila but also included Islampur Union (Chhatak), Jalalabad Union (Sylhet Sadar) as well as Rustampur & Towakul Unions (Gowainghat). The reason for the creation of a thana was because there were no main roads leading to the town and the only access was through rivers during the rainy season. The East India Company had a strong presence in the business sector in this area and thus it was named Companiganj.

During the Bangladesh Liberation War of 1971, Companiganj was part of the Bholaganj sub-sector in Sector 5 under the charge of Lieutenant Taheruddin Akhunji. 19 freedom fighters were killed in this area. It was made an upazila on 11 November 1982 by the President of Bangladesh, H M Ershad, as a part of his decentralisation programme.

Geography
Companiganj Upazila (Sylhet district) area , located in between 24°58' and 25°11' north latitudes and in between 91°41' and 91°53' east longitudes. It is bounded by Meghalaya (state of India) on the north, sylhet sadar, gowainghat and chhatak upazilas on the south, Gowainghat upazila on the east and Chhatak upazila on the west. Companiganj is home to Bangladesh's largest quarry, the Bholaganj stone quarry.

Demographics
Population Total 113784; male 59758, female 54026; Muslim 104200, Hindu 9522 and others 62. Indigenous communities such as khasia, manipuri belong to this upazila.

Water bodies Main rivers: surma and piyain; noted boars: Baowa, Lali, Loba, Poko; noted beels: Panichhapara, Nigar, Rauti and Kalenga.

Administration
Companiganj Upazila is divided into six union parishads: Isalmpur Paschim, Isalmpur Purba, Isakalas, Ranikhai Dakshin, Ranikhai Uttar, and Telikhal. The union parishads are subdivided into 76 mauzas and 131 villages.

See also
Upazilas of Bangladesh
Districts of Bangladesh
Divisions of Bangladesh

References

Source Bangladesh Population Census 2001, Bangladesh Bureau of Statistics.

 
Upazilas of Sylhet District